Republic of Pińczów was a name of short-lived entity in Świętokrzyskie Voivodeship liberated by joint forces of Polish Resistance formations: Home Army, People's Army and Peasants' Battalions, during a period from July 21 to August 12, 1944. Power in the Republic belonged to delegate of Polish Government in Exile and local commander of the Home Army Forces. There was also a separate authority for the communist forces which did not recognize the London-based government-in-exile. The Republic collapsed due to concentration of Wehrmacht nearby and lack of supplies. The anniversary of the creation of the Pińczów Republic is commemorated by local Polish authorities.

See also
 First Republic of Pińczów

References

Poland in World War II
States and territories established in 1944
States and territories disestablished in 1944
1944 disestablishments in Poland
Home Army